This is a list of Norwegian government ministries.

Current ministries

Historical ministries

References 

 Ministries since 1814 - Government.no